Sebastian Schulz (born 1977) is a German voice actor from Rostock.

Roles

Television animation
Angel Sanctuary (Setsuna Mudō (Kenji Nojima))
Avatar: The Last Airbender (Zuko) and The Legend of Korra (General Iroh) (Dante Basco))
Cardcaptor Sakura (Takashi Yamazaki (Issei Miyazaki))
Digimon Frontier (Koichi Kimura, Duskmon, KaiserLeomon, Lowemon (Kenichi Suzumura))
Dragon Ball GT (Trunks (Takeshi Kusao))
Dragon Ball Z (Future Trunks (Takeshi Kusao))
Fillmore! (Wayne Liggett (Lukas Behnken))
Genshiken (Kōsaka Makoto (Mitsuki Saiga))
I Got a Rocket (Rocket (Thomas Bromhead))
Mobile Suit Gundam SEED (Rau Le Creuset (Toshihiko Seki))
Wunschpunsch (Maurizio di Mauro (Rick Jones (voice actor)))
X TV (Kamui Shirou (Kenichi Suzumura))
Yu-Gi-Oh! (Yami Yugi (Shunsuke Kazama))

Video games
Kingdom Hearts II (Seifer (Takehito Koyasu))
Skylanders: Spyro's Adventure (Dino-Rang, Drill Sergeant (Thomas Bromhead))
Skylanders: Giants (Dino-Rang, Drill Sergeant (Thomas Bromhead))

Dubbing roles 
 Gossip Girl (Nate Archibald)
Blades of Glory (Jimmy MacElroy (Jon Heder))
Buffy the Vampire Slayer (Andrew Wells (Tom Lenk))
Malcolm in the Middle (Francis (Christopher Masterson))
Napoleon Dynamite (Napoleon Dynamite (Jon Heder))
Scrubs (Chris Turk (Donald Faison))
The Big Bang Theory (Howard Wolowitz (Simon Helberg))
Star Wars: The Force Awakens and Star Wars: The Last Jedi (General Hux) (Domhnall Gleeson)
The Dark Crystal: Age of Resistance ((skekGra, the Heretic) (Andy Samberg))

Radio plays  
 2012: Robert E. Howard: Schwarze Krallen, publisher: Titania Medien, 
 2012: M.R. James: Der Eschenbaum (The Ash-tree), publisher: Titania Medien,

External links

German Dubbing Card Index

1977 births
German male voice actors
Living people
Place of birth missing (living people)